ICF Canoe Marathon World Championships is an International Canoe Federation competition in canoe marathon in which athletes compete over long distances. The race usually starts and ends at the same place, and includes portages. Race categories vary by the number of athletes in the boat, the length of the course, and whether the boat is a canoe or kayak. In a kayak, the paddler is seated in the direction of travel, and uses a double-bladed paddle. In a canoe the paddler kneels on one knee with the other leg forward and foot flat on the floor inside the boat, and paddles a single-bladed paddle on one side only. The World Championships were held every two years from 1988, becoming annual in 1998.

Editions 
 1988:  Nottingham, United Kingdom
 1990:  Copenhagen, Denmark
 1992:  Brisbane, Australia
 1994:  Amsterdam, Netherlands
 1996:  Vaxholm, Sweden
 1998:  Cape Town, South Africa
 1999:  Győr, Hungary
 2000:  Dartmouth, Canada
 2001:  Stockton-on-Tees, United Kingdom
 2002:  Zamora, Spain
 2003:  Valladolid, Spain
 2004:  Bergen, Norway
 2005:  Perth, Australia
 2006:  Tremolat, France
 2007:  Győr, Hungary
 2008:  Týn nad Vltavou, Czech Republic
 2009:  Gaia, Portugal
 2010:  Banyoles, Spain
 2011:  Singapore
 2012:  Rome, Italy
 2013:  Copenhagen, Denmark
 2014:  Oklahoma City, United States
 2015:  Győr, Hungary
 2016:  Brandenburg an der Havel, Germany
 2017:  Pietermaritzburg, South Africa
 2018:  Vila Verde, Portugal
 2019:  Shaoxing, China
 2020:  Bærum, Norway (cancelled due to the COVID-19 pandemic)
 2021:  Pitești, Romania
 2022:  Ponte de Lima, Portugal

Medalists
The following tables give the results.

Men's K-1

Men's K-1 short race

Men's K-2

Men's C-1

Men's C-1 short race

Men's C-2

Women's K-1

Women's K-1 short race

Women's K-2

Women's C-1

Women's C-1 short race

Medal table

See also 
 International Canoe Federation
 ICF Canoe Sprint World Championships
 ICF Canoe Slalom World Championships
 Wildwater Canoeing World Championships

References

 
Marathon
Canoe marathon